Karla Knight (born 1958, New York, NY) is an American artist. She was educated at the Rhode Island School of Design where she received a BFA degree in 1980.

In the 2021–2022 season, Knight had a solo exhibition at the Aldrich Museum of Contemporary Art in Ridgefield, Connecticut.

Work
Knight has been influenced by the work of Hilma af Klint and Agnes Pelton, as well as early 20th century Surrealism. Her work addresses paranormal phenomena, the supernatural and the occult. Her paintings incorporate images of interlocking grids, futuristic spacecraft, and often include her own invented written language.

Collections
Her work is represented in the permanent collections of the Brooklyn Museum, the Museum of Modern Art, the Walker Art Center, among other venues.

References

American women artists
1958 births
20th-century American painters
Living people
American women painters
21st-century American painters